Ponikła may refer to the following places in Poland:

Ponikła, Łódź Voivodeship (central Poland)
Ponikła, Podlaskie Voivodeship (north-east Poland)
Ponikła, Pomeranian Voivodeship (north Poland)

See also 
Poniklá, a village and municipality in the Semily District in the Liberec Region of the Czech Republic